Tonopah  is an unincorporated community and census-designated place (CDP) in western Maricopa County, Arizona, United States,  west of downtown Phoenix off Interstate 10. The community is near the Palo Verde Nuclear Generating Station, the largest power producer in the country, nuclear or otherwise. As of the 2020 census, the population of Tonopah was 23, down from 60 at the 2010 census.

It is located on the Tonopah Desert. Prior to being called Tonopah, the settlement was known as "Lone Peak".

The area is also known to have been inhabited by groups of people for resource gathering area of the Hohokam, Patayan, and Yavapai cultures.

Demographics 

As of the census of 2010, there were 60 people living in the CDP. The population density was 1.13 people per square mile. The racial makeup of the CDP was 87% White, 2% Native American, 3% Asian, and 8% from other races. Twenty-three percent of the population were Hispanic or Latino of any race.

Schools
 Crossroads Academy
 Ruth Fisher Middle School
 Tonopah Valley High School
 Winters Well Elementary School

Incorporation efforts

In 2009, a political action committee named Tonopah United for Our Future (TUFF) filed paperwork with the county, proposing the incorporation of the area into a town.  The proposal ran into difficulties when the neighboring town of Buckeye voted to publicly oppose the measure.  State law forbids the incorporation of a new city or town within a specified distance of existing municipalities without their approval, and the proposed boundaries for Tonopah would abut the corporate boundaries of Buckeye, essentially giving Buckeye veto power over any incorporation efforts.  In 2003, Buckeye had passed a measure approving of any future incorporation effort by Tonopah, but the current town council rescinded the measure, citing concerns that the proposal would extend the new town's boundaries east of the Hassayampa River and into area Buckeye intends to annex.  Council members did indicate that they were open to future incorporation efforts using the river as a boundary.

Geographically it would be among the largest in the state, while estimates placed the population of the proposed town at approximately 6,000. Additionally, a number of residents opposed the plan because they believed large tax increases would be necessary to fund a new government.

Ultimately the measure was defeated on March 10, 2009, by a vote of 523 against incorporation versus 356 in support.

Belmont

In November 2017, media outlets reported that a company associated with billionaire Bill Gates purchased  between Buckeye and Tonopah for $80 million.  Gates's company  plans to create a "smart city" called Belmont on the site.

Climate

In popular culture
The chorus of the song "Willin'" by Lowell George of Little Feat on the albums Little Feat, Sailin' Shoes and Waiting for Columbus refers to either Tonopah, Arizona, or Tonopah, Nevada:

Image gallery
Pictured are the following images related to Tonopah:
 The ruins of the house of John Beauchamp, a major landowner in the area and Tonopah's first postmaster. The Beauchamp homestead house was built in 1920. The ruins of the house are located near the corner of Indian School and 411th Avenue .
 The former Saguaro Sanitarium, now the Motel Saguaro Mineral Wells, whose groundbreaking ceremony was officially dedicated on June 17, 1934, and attended by George W. P. Hunt, the first elected governor of Arizona.
 The ruins related to the Tonopah-Belmont mine workers camp.

References

Further reading
 Barnes, Will C., Byrd H. Granger, (ed.), Arizona's Names: X Marks the Place, (Falconer: 1983). 
 Clay Thompson, "Tonopah: It's Water Under The Bush", the Arizona Republic 1-12-03, p. B12.

Census-designated places in Maricopa County, Arizona
Archaeological sites in Arizona
Hot springs of Arizona
Populated places in the Sonoran Desert
Census-designated places in Arizona
Ghost towns in Arizona
Bodies of water of Maricopa County, Arizona